"Stay Down" is a song by American recording artists Lil Durk, 6lack and Young Thug. It was released on October 30, 2020, as the second single from Lil Durk's sixth studio album, The Voice. The melodic track finds the artists melancholically detailing their quest for love and loyalty. The song was written by the artists alongside producers DY of 808 Mafia and Metro Boomin.

Composition
"Stay Down" is a melancholic and melodic track, with the rappers delivering rhymes about their ladies' questionable motives, while making them understand their time and energy requires loyalty. The song "prioritizes sex and lots of money", with Durk referencing The Proud Family ("I gave you every Penny like Oscar"), and delivering non-English bars about how women of all cultures are welcome in his life. The chorus is performed by 6lack, who, as noted by Consequence  of Sounds Wren Graves, "provides a sticky ear-worm chorus that starts with a pause and heats up with double- and triple-rhymes", while Young Thug closes out the song with a "bouncy, tongue-twisting flow that could almost have served as a second hook".

Critical reception
Rap-Up noted how "Durk reflects on love while 6lack delivers the brooding chorus and Thugger adds a hypnotizing verse". Revolt's Jon Powell called it a "hard-hitting cut". Complexs Jordan Rose stated: "All three artists have become masters at being able to dip their hands into either a melodic, melancholy bag or, conversely, their hard hip-hop pockets and that skillset is made evident again here. While 6lack cruises over the beat with a more smooth, crooning sound, Thug and Durk are spitting about how loyalty and love are the perfect pairings". HipHopDX named "Stay Down" among the best hip hop songs of 2020, calling it an enjoyable track and praising 6lack for his "silky hook and verse on the track that stole the show".

Music video
The song was released alongside a video directed by Collin Fletcher and Nick Vernet. It shows Lil Durk riding a hovercraft, with all three rappers later appearing in and around heavy duty trucks, performing their verses.

Charts

Certifications

References

2020 songs
2020 singles
Lil Durk songs
6lack songs
Songs written by 6lack
Young Thug songs
Songs written by Young Thug
Songs written by Metro Boomin
Song recordings produced by Metro Boomin
Geffen Records singles
Interscope Records singles
Songs written by Lil Durk